The World Broadcasting Unions (WBU) is the coordinating body for continental broadcasting unions. Founded in 1992, it's a coordinating body at the international broadcasting level. The Toronto-based North American Broadcasters Association (NABA) acts as secretariat for the WBU.

Members
The broadcasting unions who are members of the WBU are:

 Asia-Pacific Broadcasting Union (ABU)
 Arab States Broadcasting Union (ASBU)
 African Union of Broadcasting (AUB/UAR)
 Caribbean Broadcasting Union (CBU)
 Commonwealth Broadcasting Association (CBA)
 European Broadcasting Union (EBU/UER)
 International Association of Broadcasting (IAB/AIR)
 North American Broadcasters Association (NABA)
 Organización de Telecomunicaciones de Iberoamérica (OIT/OTI)

References

External links
 Official website

Broadcasting associations
Organizations established in 1992
International organizations based in Canada